Hone Glendinning (16 August 1912 – 26 August 1997) was a British cinematographer. He worked on over seventy films, including a number of documentaries.

Selected filmography
 Bypass to Happiness (1934)
 Rolling Home (1935)
 David Livingstone (1936)
 Merry Comes to Town (1937)
 Auld Lang Syne (1937)
 The Ticket of Leave Man (1937)
 Double Exposures (1937)
 It's Never Too Late to Mend (1937)
 Under a Cloud (1937)
 Riding High (1937)
 The Mill on the Floss (1937)
 John Halifax (1938)
 Silver Top (1938)
 Sexton Blake and the Hooded Terror (1938)
 The Face at the Window (1939)
 Crimes at the Dark House (1940)
 All at Sea (1940)
 The Chinese Bungalow (1940)
 The Case of the Frightened Lady (1940)
 Code of Scotland Yard (1947)
 But Not in Vain (1948)
 The Trial of Madame X (1948)
 The Romantic Age (1949)
 Forbidden (1949)
 Midnight Episode (1950)
 Shadow of the Past (1950)
 Three Steps in the Dark (1953)
 The Harassed Hero (1954)
 Meet Mr. Malcolm (1954)
 The Finest Hours (1964)
 The Scarlet Web (1954)

References

Bibliography
 Michael F. Keaney. British Film Noir Guide. McFarland, 2008.

External links

1912 births
1997 deaths
British cinematographers
Film people from London